Johannes von Guenther or Johannes von Günther (1886–1973) was a German writer.

The 1929 silent film Cagliostro was adapted from one of his novels.

References

Bibliography
 Ulrich Weisstein. Expressionism As an International Literary Phenomenon. John Benjamins Publishing, 1973. 

1886 births
1973 deaths
People from Jelgava
People from Courland Governorate
Baltic-German people
20th-century German novelists
Emigrants from the Russian Empire to Germany